Health Improvement and Promotion Alliance (HIP-Ghana) is a nonprofit organization headquartered in Seattle, WA. Participants are from Ghana, the United States and Norway. 

The organization's mission is to provide a nonprofit environment with low overhead for health action, and basic and applied social and health research in urban slums in Africa. This should lead to the betterment of the people in areas served. HIP-Ghana embraces the goals of research in support of community based change, and realize that health is a product of underlying social inequality, environmental degradation, and fundamental biologic processes.
Several projects are underway in Nima-Maamobi - the poorest area of Accra, Ghana.

Current projects
 A comprehensive health status survey of Nima-Maamobi based upon a household survey that has already been developed and validated.
 A qualitative health survey based upon community perceptions of health priorities and needs.
 A multilevel analysis (hierarchical linear model) to ascertain the individual as well as neighborhood factors that underlie health status. This would be one of the first such analysis conducted.
 An assessment of household access to both potable and non potable water, as well as an assessment of the household budget expended on water.
 An assessment of access to sanitary facilities, including sewage, toilets, and pit latrines.
 A comparative analysis of the use of western medicine and traditional healers in Nima-Maamobi.
 The establishment of comprehensive health education programs situated within existing community groups.

People in Nima pursue multiple livelihoods strategies which are connected to migration. Thus, migration and migrants are crucial for understanding Nima's role in urban development and for making the appropriate and right recommendations for livelihoods development in Nima.

See also
 Health promotion

External links
Finding Hope in Nima.
Nima: Challenges and Hope. (Please see page 20.)

Non-profit organizations based in Seattle
Health education organizations